Wings & Things is an album by American jazz saxophonist Johnny Hodges and organist Wild Bill Davis featuring performances recorded in 1965 and released on the Verve label.

Reception

The Allmusic site awarded the album 3 stars stating "The group always swings, and it is interesting to hear Hodges in this setting".

Track listing
All compositions by Johnny Hodges except as noted
 "Wings and Things" - 7:10
 "The Nearness of You" (Hoagy Carmichael, Ned Washington) - 3:08
 "Imbo (Limbo Jazz)" (Duke Ellington) - 3:52
 "Take the "A" Train" (Billy Strayhorn) - 4:00
 "Spotted Dog" - 7:20
 "Cassanova" (Wild Bill Davis) - 2:43
 "Dow De Dow Dow Dow" (Ellington, Hodges) - 3:22
 "Peg o' My Heart" (Alfred Bryan, Fred Fisher) - 3:26

Personnel
Johnny Hodges - alto saxophone
Wild Bill Davis - organ (tracks 1 & 5-8)
Lawrence Brown - trombone (tracks 1 & 3-8)
Grant Green - guitar (tracks 1 & 3-8)
Hank Jones - piano (tracks 2-4)
Richard Davis - double bass
Ben Dixon - drums

References

Johnny Hodges albums
Wild Bill Davis albums
1965 albums
Albums produced by Creed Taylor
Verve Records albums
Albums recorded at Van Gelder Studio